Kjosneset is a neighbourhood in the city of Kristiansand in Agder county, Norway. It is located in the borough of Vågsbygd and in the district of Vågsbygd. Kjosneset is north of Smiebrygga, south of Auglandskollen, east of Kjos Haveby and west of Storenes.

Transportation

References

Geography of Kristiansand
Neighbourhoods of Kristiansand